Project K is the working title of an upcoming Indian supernatural action film written and directed by Nag Ashwin. Produced by Vyjayanthi Movies. It stars Amitabh Bachchan,  Prabhas, Deepika Padukone (in her Telugu film debut) and Disha Patani.

Simultaneously shot in Telugu and Hindi languages. The film was announced in February 2020 coinciding with 50 years of Vyjayanthi Movies. The film's production was delayed by a year due to the COVID-19 pandemic. Filming began in July 2021 at a futuristic set erected at Ramoji Film City in Hyderabad. The film's music score is composed by Santhosh Narayanan with cinematography by Dani Sanchez-Lopez. The film is described as the biggest film ever in the history of Indian Cinema. 

Project K is scheduled to be released in cinemas on 12 January 2024.

Cast 

Amitabh Bachchan
Prabhas   
Deepika Padukone
Disha Patani

Production

Development 
Following the 2018 biographical film Mahanati, director Nag Ashwin stated in August 2019 that he has been working on an original story and screenplay for a long time which would go on floors soon. The same month, Vyjayanthi Movies revealed their plans to begin Ashwin's film in September that year and invited visual artists, designers and writers to join the production. 

Vyjayanthi Movies officially announced in February 2020 that their next film with Ashwin would star Prabhas. It is intended to mark 50 years since the establishment of their studio. The film is produced by Ashwin's father-in-law C. Aswani Dutt.

Casting 
In July 2020, Hindi film actress Deepika Padukone was signed to play the lead role opposite Prabhas. Padukone felt that she was "beyond thrilled" to join the production while Ashwin stated that her character would be "surprise" as it was something which "no mainstream lead has [ever] done before". The film marks Padukone's debut in Telugu cinema. Bollywood Hungama reported that her role was initially "not substantial" but was improved to suit her stardom. In October, Amitabh Bachchan was cast in a full-length role in the film. Ashwin stated that his role was "so important that his character's name was the working title of an early draft". The film would be Bachchan's first full-length role in a Telugu film, following his previous cameo appearance in Manam (2014) and Sye Raa Narasimha Reddy (2019). In May 2022, Disha Patani joined the cast, marking her return to Telugu cinema after Loafer (2015).

It was also reported that Suriya, Mahesh Babu and Dulquer Salman will appear in the mid credits scene.

In August 2020, A. R. Rahman was initially approached to compose music for the film. Rahman did not sign the film and  Ashwin retained technicians from his earlier film Mahanati (2018), namely, music composer Mickey J. Meyer and cinematographer Dani Sanchez-Lopez. However, in February 2023, Dutt stated in an interview that Santhosh Narayanan replaced Meyer as the music director, along with a female Bollywood composer composing a song for the film. Singeetam Srinivasa Rao joined the project to serve as a mentor. Project K serves as the working title of the yet-untitled film.

Pre-production 
Ashwin stated that Project K needed high-end technology and futuristic vehicles to be developed for the film. While they can be recreated using computer-generated imagery (CGI), Ashwin wanted them to feel "authentic and genuine", therefore opted to build these vehicles from scratch with a dedicated team of engineers. In March 2022, Ashwin requested businessman Anand Mahindra to provide technical support to build such type of vehicles. A few days later, Mahindra responded that their company Mahindra & Mahindra would assist the production team from their Mahindra Research Valley campus in Chennai. In July 2021, the makers have erected a futuristic set at Ramoji Film City in Hyderabad where a significant portion of filming is expected to take place.

The film is simultaneously shot in Telugu and Hindi languages.

Filming 
Initially, the film was planned to begin its regular shoot in November 2020, however, it was postponed to the following year due to the advent of the COVID-19 pandemic.  Principal photography commenced in Hyderabad in July 2021 on the occasion of Guru Purnima, following a muhurat shot featuring Bachchan. Prabhas and Padukone joined the production in December 2021 and scenes featuring Bachchan, Prabhas and Padukone were shot. Second schedule of the shoot took place in February 2022.

Instead of shooting the entire film in a single stretch, the team divided its 80–90 days of shoot into 7–8 days every month. This would allow the production team to take time and prepare the gadgets and property to be used in this science fiction film. Therefore, the production of Project K is expected to take longer than usual. DIY Arri Alexa camera is being used to shoot the film, thus making Project K the first Indian film to use this technology.

Prabhas was expected to start filming his solo portions in April 2022, however, his knee surgery led to a delay of his upcoming projects including Salaar and Project K. 90 per cent of the shoot is being done in Ramoji Film City. In June, Bachchan shot for a scene at Raidurg metro station. In July, Padukone and Prabhas shot for a car chase sequence in Hyderabad. Prabhas completed shooting majority of his portions by the end of this schedule.

Principal photography of the film is expected to be completed by January 2023, following which post-production and visual effects works would take around 8 months.

Release
Project K is scheduled to be released in cinemas on 12 January 2024. Initially aimed for a 2022 release, it was delayed due the COVID-19 pandemic and production works. In July 2022, producer Dutt stated that they were planning to release the film either on 18 October 2023 or in January 2024 with the latter being confirmed later.

The film is planned to be released in Telugu, Hindi, Tamil, Malayalam, Kannada and English languages.

References

External links
 

Upcoming Telugu-language films
Upcoming Hindi-language films
2023 science fiction films
2020s Telugu-language films
2020s Hindi-language films
Indian science fiction films
Films shot in Hyderabad, India
Films shot at Ramoji Film City
Indian multilingual films
Films directed by Nag Ashwin
Films scored by Mickey J Meyer
Upcoming films